Muhammad Jamil Malik is a Pakistani politician affiliated with the Pakistan Muslim League (N) who served as a member of the National Assembly of Pakistan. His constituency is Gujrat-IV. In June 2012, his national assembly membership was suspended by the Supreme Court of Pakistan because he reportedly possessed dual nationality of the Netherlands.

References

Living people
Pakistani emigrants to the Netherlands
Naturalised citizens of the Netherlands
Pakistan Muslim League (N) politicians
People from Gujrat District
Punjabi people
Politicians from Punjab, Pakistan
Pakistani MNAs 2008–2013
Year of birth missing (living people)